Mary Ellen Greenfield (December 27, 1930 – May 13, 1999), known as Meg Greenfield, was an American editorial writer who worked for the Washington Post and Newsweek. She was also a Washington, D.C. insider, known for her wit. Greenfield won a Pulitzer Prize for Editorial Writing.

A book she authored was published posthumously.

Life and career
Greenfield was born in Seattle, the daughter of Lorraine (Nathan) and Lewis James Greenfield. Her family was Jewish. She attended The Bush School and graduated summa cum laude from Smith College in 1952. She also studied at Cambridge University as a Fulbright Scholar and was friends there with Norman Podhoretz, who also went on to a career in journalism.

She became influential in a male-dominated world and a close confidante of Post publisher Katharine Graham. She spent 20 years as the editorial page editor for The Washington Post and 25 years as a columnist for Newsweek. She influenced generations of Washington Post writers.

When diagnosed with cancer, Greenfield partly retired to Bainbridge Island in her native Washington, where she wrote a posthumously published memoir entitled Washington. She died of the disease, at age 68.

Greenfield was portrayed by Carrie Coon in 2017 film, The Post.

Awards and honors
Greenfield won the 1978 Pulitzer Prize for Editorial Writing.

Bibliography

References

External links

American women journalists
20th-century American memoirists
Jewish American journalists
The Washington Post people
Smith College alumni
Writers from Seattle
Pulitzer Prize for Editorial Writing winners
1930 births
1999 deaths
20th-century American women writers
20th-century American businesspeople
20th-century American businesswomen
20th-century American journalists
American women memoirists
20th-century American Jews